Kazimierz Macioch (1 June 1932 – 26 March 2011) was a Polish wrestler. He competed at the 1960 Summer Olympics and the 1964 Summer Olympics.

References

1932 births
2011 deaths
Polish male sport wrestlers
Olympic wrestlers of Poland
Wrestlers at the 1960 Summer Olympics
Wrestlers at the 1964 Summer Olympics
People from Ostrów Mazowiecka County
Sportspeople from Masovian Voivodeship
People from Warsaw Voivodeship (1919–1939)
20th-century Polish people
21st-century Polish people